John Burris (born 1985) is a Republican former member of the Arkansas House of Representatives.

References

External links 
 John Burris Legislative Website

1985 births
Living people
Republican Party members of the Arkansas House of Representatives
People from Boone County, Arkansas
American educators
Bergman High School alumni
Arkansas Tech University alumni